The orange-throated whiptail (Aspidoscelis hyperythrus) is a species of lizard in the family Teiidae. The species was previously placed in the genus Cnemidophorus. Three subspecies are recognized as being valid, including the nominotypical subspecies.

Geographic range
A. hyperythrus is native to southern California in the United States, and to the states of Baja California and Baja California Sur in Mexico.

Description
A. hyperythrus has five or six light-colored stripes down a black, brown, or grey dorsal side. The middle stripe may be forked at both ends. The species is whitish-yellow or cream on the venter, and has an orange throat (females and juveniles may lack this character). Its head is yellow-brown to olive-colored, and its tongue is forked and flicked continually.

Juveniles of this species have cobalt blue legs and tails.  The entire ventral surface of males, including the tail, may be orange, although gravid females may also have some orange especially lining the lower jaw. The colors are most distinct in the breeding season. Males have larger femoral pores than females.

Behavior
The orange-throated whiptail has a distinctive, jerking gait.

Etymology
The subspecific names, beldingi and schmidti, are in honor of American ornithologist Lyman Belding and American herpetologist Karl Patterson Schmidt, respectively.

References

External links

This article is based on a description from "A Field Guide to the Reptiles and Amphibians of Coastal Southern California", Robert N. Fisher and Ted J. Case, USGS, http://www.werc.usgs.gov/fieldguide/index.htm.
Information & picture at U.S. Geological Survey website

Further reading
Lemm, Jeffrey M. (2006). Field Guide to Amphibians and Reptiles of the San Diego Region.  California Natural History Guides. Berkeley, California: University of California Press. 344 pp. .
Stebbins RC (2003). A Field Guide to Western Reptiles and Amphibians, Third Edition. The Peterson Field Guide Series ®. Boston and New York: Houghton Mifflin Company. xiii + 533 pp. . (Cnemidophurus hyperythrus, pp. 317–318 + Plate 40 + Map 116).

Aspidoscelis
Fauna of the Southwestern United States
Reptiles of the United States
Reptiles of Mexico
Orange-throated whiptail
Orange-throated whiptail
Taxobox binomials not recognized by IUCN